Municipal code may refer to:

Community Identification Number, a number sequence for the identification of politically independent municipalities or unincorporated areas
Legal code (municipal)
Municipal ordinances, laws that are enacted and enforced by a village, town, city or county government
Gemeindeordnung, the municipal code in German law